Lutna Sake Lut (Nepali: लुट्न सके लुट), also known by the song's full name Lutna Sake Lut, Nepal Mai Ho Chhut (लुट्न सके लुट, नेपालमै हो छुट) which translate to "Loot as much as you can, you are free to do so in Nepal" is a 2019 satirical song written and produced by Nepalese folk singer Pashupati Sharma. The music video was released in February 2019, though he later took it down after receiving threats from Communist Party of Nepal (Unified Marxist–Leninist). National Folk and Duet Song Academy Nepal (Rastriya Lok Tatha Dohori Geet Pratisthan Nepal), however, asked the artist to re-upload the song.

Content
Lutna Sake Lut, Nepal Mai Ho Chhut, the full title of the song translates to "loot whatever you can, since that's allowed only in Nepal". The line Janatako mutubhitra kanda kati kati! Dedh arbako helicopter chadhchhin Rastrapati, which roughly translates to "The people have got so many thorns in their hearts, the President flies on a helicopter worth  1.5 Arba rupees (1 Arba is 100 crores or 1 short billion)"  was taken offence to by cadres of the ruling party, as a direct insult on the sitting president. There are many such strongly worded criticisms on the politicians of the country throughout the song.

Music Video 
The music video features Pashupati Sharma, Manju B.K. and Paryojal Bhandari.

Reception 
After release the song received positive feedback from Nepalese audience. After it was taken down fans demanded it be re-uploaded.

Credits and personnel 
Original version
 Pashupati Sharma - Singer, writer and producer
 Nabin Dharti Magar - Producer
 Durga Poudel - Director and editor

References

External links 

 Lyrics of this song at Genius

2019 songs
2019 singles
Nepalese songs
Nepali-language songs